The Orkan class or projekt 660 (NATO code: Sassnitz class) is series of three fast attack craft of the Polish Navy, in service since 1992.

History
The original project was prepared by the German Democratic Republic for its navy and was named Project 660, it also received the NATO reporting name "Sassnitz". After the Unification of Germany the unfinished hulls were bought by the Polish Navy from VEB Peenewerft shipyard in Wolgast and successfully completed by Northern Shipyard in Gdańsk.

In 2006, Ministry of Defence ordered 36 RBS-15 Mk 3 anti-ship missiles to equip the ships. Since 2007, they carried RBS-15 Mk 2 missiles as interim armament. RBS-15 Mk 3 missiles were first deployed in 2014. Since 2015 Orkan and Piorun underwent a 19-month, mid-life refit.

List of ships

Orkan was to have been the first destroyer constructed in Poland, but her construction was interrupted by the start of the World War II.

Gallery

References 

Orkan-class corvettes of the Polish Navy
Missile boats of East Germany
Ships built in Wolgast